Anka is a diminutive form (and hypocorism) of the female given name Anna.

Notable people with the name include:

Given name
 Anka Lambreva (1895-1976), Bulgarian nurse, teacher and adventurer
 Princess Anka Obrenović (1821-1868), Serbian princess
 Anka Bakova (born 1957), Bulgarian former rower
 Anka Čekanová (1905-1965), Czech dancer
 Anka Georgieva (born 1959), Bulgarian former rower
 Anka Grupińska (born 1956), Polish dissident, journalist and writer
 Anka Khristolova (born 1955), Bulgarian former volleyball player
Anka Krizmanić (1896–1987), Croatian painter and printmaker
 Anka Muhlstein (born 1935), French historian and biographer
 Anka Wolbert (born 1963), Dutch musician, singer and songwriter

Surname
 Paul Anka (born 1941), musician popular mainly in the 1950s and '60s in the United States
 Yushau Anka (born 1950), Nigerian politician
 Andó Anasztázia (Anka) (born 2003), Hungarian musician

Fictional characters
 Arne Anka, a poet/party duck by the cartoonist Charlie Christensen
 Anka The Machine-Gunner, a female movie character popular in Russian humor

Feminine given names
Hypocorisms

Slavic given names
Russian feminine given names
Polish feminine given names
Slovene feminine given names
Serbian feminine given names

ja:アンカ
tr:Simurg